Trapania sanctipetrensis is a species of sea slug, a dorid nudibranch, a marine gastropod mollusc in the family Goniodorididae.

Distribution
This species was described from Sancti-Petri, Chiclana de la Frontera, Bay of Cadiz, south west Spain.

Description
The body of this goniodorid nudibranch is translucent white with a network of brown markings on the surface. The gills, oral tentacles and tail are tipped with white pigment.

Ecology
Trapania sanctipetrensis probably feeds on Entoprocta which often grow on sponges and other living substrata but it was found on Bugula neritina.

References

Goniodorididae
Gastropods described in 2000